Amolops medogensis is a species of frog in the family Ranidae, the "true frogs". It is endemic to Mêdog County in southeastern Tibet, China; its range might extend into the adjacent Arunachal Pradesh, India. Common name Medog torrent frog has been proposed for it.

Individuals have been found on rocks under waterfalls. It is a rare species. The population is considered stable, but it is strongly threatened by Yarang Dam in part of its range. In addition, habitat loss  and degradation caused by smallholder farming is a minor threat. The entire known range is within the Yaluzangbudaxiagu National Nature Reserve.

References

medogensis
Frogs of China
Endemic fauna of Tibet
Amphibians described in 2005
Taxonomy articles created by Polbot